Department of Agriculture, Bampur ( – Ādāreh Keshāvarzī) is a village and government facility in Bampur-e Sharqi Rural District, in the Central District of Bampur County, Sistan and Baluchestan Province, Iran. At the 2006 census, its population was 48, in 9 families.

References 

Populated places in Bampur County